The Toyota TF108 was a Formula One car with which Toyota competed in the 2008 Formula One season. The chassis was designed by Pascal Vasselon, John Litjens and Mark Gillan with the engine being designed by Luca Marmorini and Noritoshi Arai overseeing the entire project. The cars best finish was second in the Hungarian Grand Prix, driven by Timo Glock.

Launch
The 2008 Toyota challenger, the Toyota TF108, was launched on 10 January 2008, at the team's factory in Cologne, Germany.

Jarno Trulli was retained as one of the team's drivers for the 2008 season and was joined by former Jordan driver Timo Glock. The Toyota test and reserve driver for the 2008 season was Japanese driver Kamui Kobayashi.

The Toyota team let driver Ralf Schumacher go at the end of the 2007 Formula One season, Schumacher then signed a contract with Mercedes-Benz in the DTM for the 2008 season.

Technical developments

New concept design
The TF108 had a new longer wheelbase to aid stability and a totally new aero package that was hoped to give the car great potential. It was not an evolution of the previous year's TF107; instead it had been designed from an evolution of the TF106, used for the 2006 season. Pascal Vasselon, the team's chassis general manager noted that the "primary aerodynamic design philosophy for the TF108 is geared towards optimising the entire package".

Rule changes 
The car also had the new for 2008 higher headrests around the drivers head and also had the new standard McLaren Electronic Systems ECU that prevented the car having driver aids.

Changes in aerodynamics
Toyota had adopted a McLaren MP4-22-like bridge on the front wing, and also moved the rear view mirrors outboard, like Ferrari and Renault. The TF108 had also had a major focus on cleaning the air flow around the front suspension, maximising the zero keel concept of the front suspension.

Alternative liveries

At the 2008 French Grand Prix the car ran with a black stripe along the nosecone, to commemorate the life of former Toyota F1 boss, Ove Andersson, who had died earlier that month.

At the 2008 British Grand Prix, the car ran with a special Batman livery. The team signed a deal with Warner Brothers to promote the new film, The Dark Knight, which was released on 25 July.

2008 season

2008 testing
Timo Glock was fastest in testing at Jerez on 17 January, whilst test driver Kamui Kobayashi was 7th fastest on the same day.

Toyota and Ferrari had been the only teams in 2008 to test outside the common test tracks in Spain (Valencia, Jerez and the Circuit de Catalunya), having chosen to test in sunnier conditions in Bahrain from the 4th to 6 February and 9th until 11 February 2008.

Later in the month of February, Toyota, alongside Ferrari, returned to the Circuit de Catalunya to finish off their preparations for the season opener in Melbourne. Toyota rolled out a new aero package, with Pascal Vasselon saying that "The new aerodynamics package we brought here is a clear step forward". The very next day, Jarno Trulli completed the day with a time of 1.20.801, fastest overall, Red Bull-Renault driver David Coulthard was second with a time of 01:21.258 on the same day.

Racing
The TF108 marked an improvement of form for Toyota. Trulli scored points in 10 of the 18 races, with a 3rd place in France the highlight of his season. Teammate Glock finished in the points at 6 races including 2nd in Hungary. With a total of 56 points, Toyota scored more points in 2008 then the last 2 seasons combined. 
Both Trulli and Glock were retained for 2009.

Complete Formula One results
(key) (results in bold indicate pole position)

References

External links 

 TF108 Technical Specifications

Toyota Formula One cars
2008 Formula One season cars